The Sheth–Tormen approximation is a halo mass function.

Background 
The Sheth–Tormen approximation extends the Press–Schechter formalism by assuming that halos are not necessarily spherical, but merely elliptical. The parameters were empirically obtained from the five-year release of WMAP.

Discrepancies with simulations 
In 2010, the Bolshoi Cosmological Simulation predicted that the Sheth–Tormen approximation is inaccurate for the most distant objects.

References 

Dark matter
Physical cosmology
Equations of astronomy
Astrophysics